Mexico competed at the 2012 Summer Olympics in London, from 27 July to 12 August 2012. This was the nation's twenty-second appearance at the Olympics since its debut in 1900. Comité Olímpico Mexicano sent a total of 102 athletes to the Games, 64 men and 38 women, to compete in 23 sports. Men's football was the only team sport in which Mexico was represented at these Olympic Games. There was only a single competitor in badminton, sprint canoeing, and table tennis.

The Mexican team featured several medal prospects for London, including taekwondo jin and defending champion María Espinoza, who was the nation's flag bearer at the opening ceremony. Equestrian show jumper Jaime Azcárraga, who had competed in Olympics since 1984, marked his return in London after a twenty-year absence and was also the oldest member of the team, at age 52. Laser Radial sailor Tania Elías Calles and windsurfer David Mier, on the other hand, competed at their fourth Olympics.

This was Mexico's most successful Olympics where it was not the host nation, winning a total of 8 medals (1 gold, 3 silver, and 4 bronze), and surpassing their record from Los Angeles and Sydney by a single medal. Three of these medals were awarded to the athletes in diving, and two in archery for the first time. Among the nation's medalists were springboard diver Laura Sánchez, who won Mexico's first Olympic medal for a female in an individual event. Meanwhile, taekwondo jin María Espinoza and platform diver Paola Espinosa became the first Mexican women in history to win a total of two Olympic medals. Mexico also set a milestone in its team sports, as the men's football team won its first ever Olympic gold medal in the final match against Brazil.

Medalists

| width="78%" align="left" valign="top" |

| width="22%" align="left" valign="top" |

Competitors

Archery

Men

Women

Athletics

Men
Track & road events

Field events

Women
Track & road events

Badminton

Boxing

Men

Canoeing

Sprint

Legend: FA = Qualify to final A (medal); FB = Qualify to final B (non-medal); OB = Olympic Best

Cycling

Road

Diving

Men

Women

Equestrian

Jumping

Fencing

Men

Women

Football

Men's tournament

Roster

Group play

Quarter-final

Semi-final

Gold medal match

Final rank

Gymnastics

Artistic
Men

Women

Judo

Modern pentathlon

* Did not finish

Rowing

Men

Women

Qualification Legend: FA=Final A (medal); FB=Final B (non-medal); FC=Final C (non-medal); FD=Final D (non-medal); FE=Final E (non-medal); FF=Final F (non-medal); SA/B=Semifinals A/B; SC/D=Semifinals C/D; SE/F=Semifinals E/F; QF=Quarterfinals; R=Repechage

Sailing

Men

Women

M = Medal race; EL = Eliminated – did not advance into the medal race;

Shooting

Men

Women

Swimming

Men

Women

Synchronized swimming

Table tennis

Taekwondo

Triathlon

Weightlifting

Wrestling

Men's freestyle

See also
Mexico at the 2011 Pan American Games
Mexico at the 2012 Winter Youth Olympics

References

Summer Olympics
Nations at the 2012 Summer Olympics
2012